Edward Charles Gurney Boyle, Baron Boyle of Handsworth,  (31 August 1923 – 28 September 1981) was a British Conservative Party politician and Vice-Chancellor of the University of Leeds.

Early life and career
Boyle was born in Kensington, London, the eldest son of Sir Edward Boyle, 2nd Baronet, and succeeded to his father's baronetcy in 1945. He was educated at Eton College and graduated from Christ Church, Oxford, in 1949 with a third-class BA (later converted to an MA) in history. From 1942 to 1945, he was a temporary junior administration officer at the Foreign Office. He worked at Bletchley Park in intelligence.

Political career
Boyle entered Parliament in 1950 as MP for Birmingham Handsworth, a seat he would hold until his retirement in 1970. He served as Parliamentary Private Secretary to the Under-Secretary of State for Air from 1951 to 1952 and to the Under-Secretary of State for Defence in 1952, Parliamentary Secretary to the Minister of Supply from 1954 to 1955, Economic Secretary to the Treasury from 1955 to 1956, Parliamentary Secretary to the Minister of Education from 1957 to 1959, Financial Secretary to the Treasury from 1959 to 1962, Minister of Education from 1962 to 1964 and Minister of State for Education and Science in 1964. In 1957 he opened the new teaching block and science block extension at Abingdon School.

University of Leeds

Boyle was appointed Vice-Chancellor of the University of Leeds in 1970. He was a Trustee of the British Museum from 1970 to 1981 and Chairman of the Committee of Vice-Chancellors and Principals of UK Universities from 1977 to 1979.

In 1977 he had been due to deliver the Reith Lectures for the BBC. Despite 2 years preparation time, he withdrew with 3 months notice.

Boyle died from cancer in Leeds on 28 September 1981, aged 58. He was unmarried and childless and whilst his life peerage became extinct at his death, his baronetcy passed to his brother, Richard.

Honours
On his retirement from parliament in 1970, Boyle was awarded a life peerage as Baron Boyle of Handsworth, of Salehurst in the County of Sussex.

Boyle was awarded the honorary degree of Doctor of Laws (LLD) by the following universities:

 University of Leeds (1965)
 University of Southampton (1965)
 University of Bath (1968)
 University of Sussex (1972)
 University of Liverpool (1981)
Boyle also received an Honorary Doctorate from Heriot-Watt University in 1977.

Boyle was appointed a Companion of Honour (CH) on 13 June 1981.

Flanders and Swann satirically cited "Edward Boyle's Law" : The greater the external pressure, the greater the volume of hot air.

Edward Boyle Memorial Trust Foundation Scholarship 
The Edward Boyle Memorial Trust was established in the wake of the death of the Lord Edward Boyle, in September 1981.

Its aims were the advancement of education, learning and music and its guidelines are as follows:

 support will be given to talented young people at a time when they are in most need;
 the Trust does not intend to do what institutions or individuals should do for themselves. It will help those with proven talent who have shown that they deserve help and are prepared to make their own substantial contribution;
 the Trust will support originality and excellence;
 administration costs will be kept to a minimum;
 because some donors have indicated ways in which they wish their contributions to be used the Trustees will endeavor to meet their requests.

The Trust offered the following support:

 Ove Arup/Edward Boyle Scholarships, intended for students from Hong Kong, Singapore or Malaysia following an undergraduate course in mechanical or electrical and electronic engineering, and
 Medical Elective Bursaries intended for Commonwealth students.

Publications
The politics of education: Edward Boyle and Anthony Crosland in conversation with Maurice Kogan (Penguin education specials), ed. M. Kogan, Harmondsworth : Penguin, 1971.
The Bedside 'Guardian' 22 (1972-73). Introduction, London : Collins, 1973.

References

External links 

 

1923 births
1981 deaths
Alumni of Christ Church, Oxford
Baronets in the Baronetage of the United Kingdom
Bletchley Park people
British Secretaries of State for Education
Conservative Party (UK) MPs for English constituencies
Conservative Party (UK) life peers
Deaths from cancer in England
Members of the Order of the Companions of Honour
Members of the Privy Council of the United Kingdom
Ministers in the Eden government, 1955–1957
Ministers in the Macmillan and Douglas-Home governments, 1957–1964
Ministers in the third Churchill government, 1951–1955
People educated at Eton College
Presidents of the Association for Science Education
Presidents of the Oxford Union
Presidents of the Oxford University Conservative Association
Trustees of the British Museum
UK MPs 1950–1951
UK MPs 1951–1955
UK MPs 1955–1959
UK MPs 1959–1964
UK MPs 1964–1966
UK MPs 1966–1970
UK MPs who were granted peerages
Vice-Chancellors of the University of Leeds
Foreign Office personnel of World War II
Life peers created by Elizabeth II
Presidents of the Classical Association